"Conundrum" is the title of the 22nd episode of the fourteenth season of the American television drama series Dallas. It is also the 356th and last episode of the original Dallas series.

The episode originally aired on CBS on Friday, May 3, 1991 as a double-length episode. Subsequent airings in syndication split the episode into individual hours, which raises the total episode count to 23 for the season and 357 for the series.

The plot of the episode mirrors that of the film It's a Wonderful Life, as J.R. Ewing is taken on a journey to visit what would become of the Ewing family had he never existed.

Plot

Background
It has taken many years and numerous efforts by a multitude of people over the course of his life, but finally J.R. Ewing (Larry Hagman) has been reduced to practically nothing. He has lost control of the Southfork ranch, which was given to Bobby (Patrick Duffy) by Clayton Farlow (Howard Keel) after he decided to spend more time traveling with Miss Ellie (Barbara Bel Geddes).

J.R.'s business empire has also crumbled. Clayton gave him voting power on the board at WestStar Oil, but through the scheming of Clayton's son Dusty (Jared Martin) and WestStar executive Carter McKay (George Kennedy), J.R. was tricked into selling the controlling stake in Ewing Oil to his archenemy, Cliff Barnes (Ken Kercheval). After McKay revealed the ruse to J.R., he promptly fired him from WestStar and left him with no form of employment. Additionally, J.R.'s long-time secretary Sly Lovegren (Deborah Rennard) left Ewing Oil to marry, and Bobby's secretary Phyllis Wapner (Deborah Tranelli) refused to help J.R., telling him that "Hell would freeze over" before she worked for him.

Finally, J.R. lost his closest family member as his son and namesake John Ross (Omri Katz) disowned him, deciding to stay in London to be with his mother Sue Ellen (Linda Gray) and her new husband Don Lockwood (Ian McShane). The fallout from these events appeared to be too much for J.R. to bear.

Events
The episode begins with the defeated J.R. walking around the Southfork pool in a drunken stupor with a bottle of bourbon in one hand and a loaded pearl handled six-shooter in the other. J.R. is seriously contemplating whether or not to turn the gun on himself.

A spirit named Adam (portrayed by Joel Grey) pays a visit to J.R., who cannot believe what he is seeing. The white tuxedo-clad Adam tells J.R. his "boss" likes him and has dispatched him to Earth. In a parallel with the storyline of the movie It's a Wonderful Life, Adam proceeds to take J.R. on a journey to show him what life would have been like for other people if he had not been born. Among what he shows him:

 J.R.'s place as eldest Ewing child would have been taken by Gary (Ted Shackelford), who would also take over for J.R. as heir to the Ewing Oil fortune. Bobby thus becomes the middle brother, and the Ewings would have a third son named Jason (Patrick Pankhurst).
 Since Gary was not anywhere near the oil man that his brothers were, Ewing Oil went bankrupt under his watch. As such, Jock (Jim Davis) committed suicide when the company went bust. Heartbroken, Miss Ellie had the coroner record his cause of death as a stress-related illness, and herself died two years later, blaming herself for having forced Jock to hand the company over to Gary, and never meeting Clayton Farlow. The non-existent Jason would have become a shady real estate developer and cheating husband who would eventually trick Bobby and Gary into selling their stakes in Ewing Oil and Southfork, leaving the property in his hands once his parents died. This would result in the destruction of the ranch in favor of "Southfork Estates", a development of tract houses built in its wake. Jason would also become a family pariah, as Gary wants nothing to do with him and Bobby was swindled out of $500,000 in a bad real estate deal of his.
Having never met Pam (Victoria Principal) due to there being no rivalry between J.R. and Pam's brother Cliff, and due in part to losing all of his savings in Jason's deal gone wrong, Bobby's wild ways caught up with him and he became a down-and-out hustler owing thousands in gambling debts and child support which he cannot pay. Carter McKay is connected with his gambling debts, as due to his firing at WestStar Oil he went into the casino business in Las Vegas. Bobby later settles his debt, but Adam tells J.R. it will not be the last time he runs into money trouble.
Gary spent his life becoming a successful divorce lawyer in Beverly Hills, who never married and thus never had J.R.'s niece Lucy (Charlene Tilton). However, he still meets Valene Clements (Joan Van Ark) - in this universe, Valene Wallace - who is seeking an inheritance from her late husband's estate. They agree to go on a date together, and Adam hints that Gary and Val were always destined to meet.
Without having met J.R., Cally Harper (Cathy Podewell) never left her poor roots, and lives with an abusive husband in a shack. She finally takes a stand and shoots him dead, but will eventually go to jail for murder because no one would believe her husband beat her (according to what Adam tells J.R.).
Without J.R. in the way and forcing him to be a part of the Ewing-Barnes rivalry, Cliff Barnes became a politician. When J.R. sees that Cliff has become Vice President of the United States, he tells Adam of its impossibility, that Cliff would ruin the country, and that he did not like the fact that Cliff would rise to his position of power. To make matters worse, Cliff becomes Acting President when the sitting President is disabled by a stroke. Adam goes on to tell J.R. that Cliff will become one of the great Presidents, and that it did not matter whether he liked it or not.
Since J.R. was never born (and thus never shot), Kristin Shepard (Mary Crosby) never met him (and thus never died), and became a successful con artist in Los Angeles. She poses as a hooker initially and then a police officer, which sees her accept a bribe from an embarrassed customer.
Having never met J.R., Sue Ellen has entered acting and become a successful soap opera star. Since Nicholas Pearce (Jack Scalia) never met J.R. (and thus was never shoved out of the window to his death), he was able to form a relationship with Sue Ellen, who did not develop her alcohol problem that plagued her throughout her marriage.
With J.R. out of the picture and Jock dying before he could find out, Ray Krebbs (Steve Kanaly) never knew of his Ewing blood ties. After an injury he suffered in a Ewing Oil-sponsored rodeo, Ray was forced to become a ranch hand and would often find himself out of work. Fortunately for Ray, however, he was able to have a great family life with a wife and children who loved him unconditionally, even if he could not always provide for them. One of his sons is named Jock.

After being taken through this journey, Adam tries to get J.R. to shoot himself. J.R. tells Adam he does not want to give Adam the satisfaction as he went back to Heaven. Adam then asks J.R. what made him think he was dispatched from Heaven and begins laughing demonically, revealing his true purpose.

J.R. is immediately jolted awake in his bedroom while still holding the bourbon bottle and the revolver. He appears relieved that it was only a bad dream, but once again reality sets in for J.R. and the current state of his life.

Once again Adam appears to J.R., this time in the bedroom mirror in a red suit. Adam is determined to have J.R. shoot himself, reminding him how better off everyone concerned would be. J.R. seems willing to oblige.

Meanwhile, Bobby has returned to Southfork for the night. J.R. does not hear him pull up or enter the house, as his focus is solely on Adam in his mirror. He slowly raises the gun to his head and cocks the hammer, and the frustrated Adam finally screams "Do it!" to J.R. with glowing red eyes. Bobby hears a gunshot and runs to the second floor to J.R.'s bedroom to see what has happened. The episode concludes with Bobby standing in the doorway, saying "oh my God" in disbelief; the series thus ends with J.R.'s fate unknown.

Resolution
The "Conundrum" cliffhanger was not resolved until 1996, with the first Dallas reunion movie, Dallas: J.R. Returns. It was revealed in the beginning of the movie that J.R. had not, in fact, shot himself, but had instead shot at the mirror where Adam was appearing to him. The 2012 revival series did not acknowledge the reunion movie. However, when the revival series began, J.R. was still alive. According to the Dallas Facebook page, J.R. had indeed shot the mirror, but unlike the Reunion film, he didn't flee to Europe to recover.

Reception
Although the audience had dwindled considerably, with the series ending at #63 for the 1990-91 season, Dallas final telecast was the second highest rated program of the week. "Conundrum" pulled a 22 rating and 38% share of the audience. This was Dallas highest rated episode since the January 23, 1987 episode "Night Visitor".

The two-part season finale is the 15th most watched television series finale in U.S. history. The sharp decline in the soap's audience had been largely attributed to the early 1990s decrease in Friday primetime viewership as Friday nights gradually had become graveyard slots on U.S. television. In 2011, the whole two-part finale was ranked #13 on the TV Guide Network special, TV's Most Unforgettable Finales.

References

1991 American television episodes
Dallas (TV franchise) episodes
American television series finales